Peter Sauder is a Canadian film and TV writer, television producer and animator best known for his contributions to Nelvana franchises such as Care Bears (whose three movies he wrote), Babar, Strawberry Shortcake and Droids. Peter, who is originally from Toronto, wrote the first ever story for another hit Nelvana series, Franklin. He is sometimes credited as Pete Sauder.

Sauder also served as head writer for the first season (1983–84) of DiC's Inspector Gadget (the first season was co-produced with Nelvana), as well as Disney Channel/CBC's live-action series The Edison Twins. In the late 1990s, he was story editor for the computer-animated television programs Rolie Polie Olie and Donkey Kong Country.

Sauder started his career working as animator on A Cosmic Christmas, Romie-0 and Julie-8, Intergalactic Thanksgiving and Easter Fever.

Among his later projects are Lunar Jim, The Doodlebops, The Cat in the Hat Knows a Lot About That and Doki.

Screenwriting credits

Television
 series head writer denoted in bold
 Inspector Gadget (1983)
 The Get Along Gang (1984)
 The Edison Twins (1984)
 Star Wars: Droids (1985-1986)
 Care Bears (1986-1987)
 My Pet Monster (1987)
 Beetlejuice (1989)
 Babar (1989-1991)
 Little Rosey (1990)
 Rupert (1991-1992)
 Dog City (1992-1994)
 Tales from the Cryptkeeper (1993-1994, 1999)
 The Neverending Story (1995)
 Blazing Dragons (1996)
 Donkey Kong Country (1997)
 Franklin (1997, 2002)
 Rolie Polie Olie (1998)
 George Shrinks (2000)
 Zeroman (2004)
 The Doodlebops (2007)
 Busytown Mysteries (2007-2010)
 Best Ed (2008)
 The Cat in the Hat Knows a Lot About That! (2010)
 Justin Time (2011)
 Doki (2013, 2015)

Film
 Strawberry Shortcake: Housewarming Surprise (1983)
 Rock & Rule (1983)
 Strawberry Shortcake and the Baby Without a Name (1984)
 The Care Bears Battle the Freeze Machine (1984)
 The Care Bears Movie (1985)
 Strawberry Shortcake Meets the Berrykins (1985)
 Care Bears Movie II: A New Generation (1986)
 The Care Bears Adventure in Wonderland (1987)
 Babar: The Movie (1989)
 Babar: King of the Elephants (1999)

External links

Year of birth missing (living people)
Living people
Canadian male screenwriters
Canadian television writers
Canadian television producers
20th-century Canadian screenwriters
20th-century Canadian male writers
21st-century Canadian screenwriters
21st-century Canadian male writers